"Salimos de Aquí" is a song written and composed by Puerto Rican rock band Fiel A La Vega. It was their first single from their first album, in 1996, and is considered one of their biggest hits to date. It was written by band singer Tito Auger. The title means "We Came From Here".

The song is a call for Puerto Ricans to be proud of their culture and heritage. It features several references to Puerto Rican culture and society.

Lyrical References
 "El baile, la botella y la baraja" (Dance, drinks and games) - a reference to things that are given to the people to divert their attention from real issues, similar to the phrase "Weapons of mass distraction".
 "El Yunque" - one of the most known mountains in Puerto Rico.
 "Picadillo" - a dish made of shredded ground beef popular in Latin America.
 "Bosque de azúcar y café" (sugar and coffee forest) - a reference to the economy of Puerto Rico previously based on coffee and sugar plantations.
 "Sombra asociada" (shadow of association) - a reference to Puerto Rico's political status of association to the United States.
 "culantro" - a popular seasoning used in Puerto Rican foods.
 "Aprendimos sin querer a comernos las 's'" (we learned to eat the "s") - a reference to Puerto Rican's custom of omitting the letter "S" in the end of the words.
 "somos los que alternan Coca-Cola con maví" (alternate Coca-Cola with maví) - a reference to Puerto Rican's acceptance of both American and local drinks.
 "de las casas de cemento" (of concrete houses) - a reference to the practice of building concrete houses in the island.

Music video
The band also released a video for the song. The video was directed by Paloma Suau and was recorded in a farm in the band's hometown of Vega Alta and Vega Baja in Puerto Rico.

The video features cuts of Puerto Rican people and events intercalated with the band performing in the farm.

See also
 Fiel a la Vega

External links
.

Fiel a la Vega
1996 songs
Puerto Rican songs
Songs about Puerto Rico